Leutnant Wilhelm Frickart was a World War I flying ace credited with twelve aerial victories. He is the only known German observer to become an ace balloon buster. After pilot training, he scored five additional victories, to become an ace a second time.

Biography

Early life

Wilhelm Maxmilian Frickart was born in Engers, the German Empire on 25 July 1893.

Military service in Russia

Frickart was originally assigned to duty as an observer/gunner on the Russian Front with FA 24 (later redubbed FA 242). He scored his first victory on 12 April 1917, teaming with Leopold Anslinger to shoot down a Voisin. He followed up for a second one on 27 April. Between 15 and 28 June, he shot down five Russian observation balloons.

Military service in France

Frickart then went for pilot training, and was consequently assigned to FA 20 on the Western Front. He had three wins there, only one of which, scored on 17 March 1918, was confirmed. From there, he progressed to flying fighters for Jagdstaffel 64 in mid-1918. He then moved to Jagdstaffel 65 on 19 August 1918 as deputy commander under fellow ace Otto Fitzner, and intermittently commanded the squadron while scoring his last four wins between 30 August and 4 October 1918.

Sources of information

References
 Above the Lines: The Aces and Fighter Units of the German Air Service, Naval Air Service and Flanders Marine Corps 1914 - 1918 Norman L. R. Franks, et al. Grub Street, 1993. .

Year of birth missing
Year of death missing
German World War I flying aces
Luftstreitkräfte personnel
Military personnel from Rhineland-Palatinate